Edward Seckerson is a British music journalist and radio presenter specialising in musical theatre. Formerly Chief Classical Music Critic of the Independent, Edward Seckerson is a writer, broadcaster and podcaster. He wrote and presented the long-running BBC Radio 3 series Stage & Screen in which he interviewed many of the most prominent writers and stars of musical theatre. He appears regularly on BBC Radio 3 and 4. On television, he has commentated a number of times at the Cardiff Singer of the World competition. He has published books on Mahler and the conductor Michael Tilson Thomas, and has been on Gramophone Magazine’s review panel for many years. Edward presented the long-running BBC Radio Four musical quiz Counterpoint for one year in 2007, after the death of Ned Sherrin.

He has interviewed everyone from Leonard Bernstein to Liza Minnelli; from Paul McCartney to Pavarotti: from Julie Andrews to Jessye Norman.

Journalist and critic 

Edward is a prolific writer and journalist. His current posts include:

A member of the review panel for Gramophone Magazine

Previous appointments as reviewer and critic include:

Chief Classical Music Critic of the Independent
Chief Music Critic for The Sunday Correspondent
Music Critic for The Guardian
Classical Music Magazine
BBC Music Magazine
Hi-Fi News & Record Review Magazine
The Strad
Has written also for The Times and The Sunday Times

Broadcaster 

A wide range of programmes on BBC Radio 3 and Radio 4 as writer, presenter, commentator and critic, including:

BBC Radio 3 

Stage & Screen - Writer and Presenter

This long-running series included Edward’s acclaimed interviews with Julie Andrews, Angela Lansbury, Liza Minnelli, Patti LuPone, Barbara Cook, Michael Ball, Stephen Sondheim, Elaine Paige, Andrew Lloyd Webber, Elton John

Presenter Weekend Morning on 3

Presenter of The BBC Proms
Afternoon Performance
CD Review – incl. Building a Library and the annual ‘Critics Choice’
Nightwaves
The Changing Voice
In Character

Mining The Archive
Performance on 3

BBC Radio 4 

Presenter of Counterpoint on BBC Radio 4, 2007,
Kaleidoscope special with Sir Paul McCartney, and
Woman's Hour with Elaine Paige

Television 
BBC Cardiff Singer of the World coverage
Julie Andrews sings Richard Rodgers - Polygram Video/TV Special
Leonard Bernstein: Reaching for the Note
Jacqueline du Pré: Playing With Fire
The South Bank Show: Leif Ove Andsnes
Maxim Vengerov: Playing By Heart

Podcasts 
English National Opera
Glyndebourne Festival Opera
London Philharmonic Orchestra
City of London Festival
Joseph Weinberger Ltd (all also available via The Independent Online)
Stage and Screen Online

Public appearances 

Judging panel for The Voice of Musical Theatre Competition in Cardiff
Judging panel for The Sondheim Prize
Moderated public interviews with Stephen Sondheim (Queen's Theatre, London) and Charles Strouse (Shaw Theatre, London)
Pre-performance events for the BBC Proms, English National Opera, Cheltenham Festival, London Philharmonic Orchestra, Royal Philharmonic Orchestra
Royal Opera House, Covent Garden: public interviews with Bryn Terfel, Renee Fleming, John Tomlinson, Jonas Kaufmann, Juan Diego Florez
Wigmore Hall: Evenings with Anja Silja and Margaret Price

Acting 
Radio: Numerous dramas incl. The Archers, BBC Radio 4: Peter Stephens

Film 
Young Winston (dir Richard Attenborough),
Julia (dir Fred Zinnemann), and
A Bridge Too Far, (dir Richard Attenborough)

A Bridge Too Far (1977) - British Padre (Last appearance)

Television 
The Regiment
Get Some In

Get Some In! (1977) - LAC driver

Theatre 
Bristol Old Vic
Tyneside Theatre Company
Timothy West Company at the Billingham Forum
Edinburgh Festival Fringe

Publications 

Mahler: His Life and Times (Omnibus Press)
Michael Tilson Thomas: Viva Voce - a collection of conversations with the American conductor (Faber and Faber)

Liner notes & EPK Promotional Videos for Deutsche Gramophone, EMI, Decca, and others.

Essays on Leonard Bernstein's Candide and The Merry Wives of Windor in Music for the Edinburgh Festival and Royal Shakespeare Company programmes

References

External links
Edward Seckerson's official website

BBC Radio 3 presenters
British male journalists
British radio presenters
Classical music radio presenters
Living people
Year of birth missing (living people)